William Franklin (born October 13, 1985) is a former American football wide receiver. He was drafted by the Kansas City Chiefs in the fourth round of the 2008 NFL Draft. He played college football at Missouri.

Franklin was also a member of the Detroit Lions, Oakland Raiders, Winnipeg Blue Bombers, Las Vegas Locomotives, Omaha Beef and Bloomington Edge.

Early years
Franklin first attended Beaumont High School before transferring to and finishing his prep career at Vashon High School in St. Louis. Making his debut as a senior at Vashon, Franklin couldn't have been more spectacular: He hauled in seven passes for  an astounding 221 yards, while scoring four touchdowns. In the process,  his Wolverines outlasted the DeSmet Spartans 46-30. Later that spring, for good measure he flashed his speed on the track, by capturing the Missouri Class 3 boys 100-meter state title in 10.81 seconds. He also ran a leg on the school's state-winning 4x200-meter relay squad. Franklin's speed was also matched by his great leaping ability, earning him the nickname 'The Helicopter'.

College career
In his freshman season, 2004, Franklin played in 11 games and caught six passes for 174 yards. Two of his best games came against Ball State where he caught two passes for 76 yards with a touchdown and Kansas when he caught two passes for 86 yards. In 2005, he played in 12 games and finished fourth on the team with 40 catches for 413 yards and two touchdowns. He posted a career-high eight receptions and 116 yards against Arkansas State in Arrowhead Stadium. Fanklin played 11 games during his junior (2006), during which he recorded 48 receptions and 829 yards and six touchdowns. His 829 yards is the seventh highest all-time in Missouri football history. He missed the final two games of the season suffering from a shoulder injury. As a senior in 2007, Franklin started all 14 games. He caught for 49 passes for 709 yards and four touchdowns. He was named honorable mention All-Big 12.

Professional career

Kansas City Chiefs
Franklin was drafted by the Kansas City Chiefs with the 105th pick in the 2008 NFL Draft. He played in 13 games during his rookie season making seven catches and 83 receiving yards. He was waived by the Chiefs on April 13, 2009.

Detroit Lions
Franklin was claimed off waivers by the Detroit Lions on April 14, 2009. The St. Louis Rams, Philadelphia Eagles, Indianapolis Colts and Oakland Raiders also submitted claims. He was waived on May 15, 2009.

Oakland Raiders
Franklin was claimed off waivers by the Oakland Raiders on May 19, 2009. He was waived on August 31.

Winnipeg Blue Bombers
Franklin signed with the Winnipeg Blue Bombers on March 15, 2010.

Personal life
Franklin served as the Coordinator of Player Development at Missouri, and in December 2018, was named head football coach and assistant athletic director at Vashon HS. Franklin is the nephew of former NFL wide receiver Darnay Scott. Franklin won his first game as the Vashon Wolverines varsity head coach against his former coach Reginald Ferguson, now at Miller Career Academy, 46-45 in a midseason shootout. Franklin's team trailed at one point 31-19 in the third quarter before mounting a furious comeback. The victory was keyed by all-purpose star Phillip Russell who scored five touchdowns on the day, including an interception return, a kickoff return, a reverse and a couple of receptions. 
   "I'm proud of these guys," Franklin would tell the St. Louis Argus newspaper afterwards. "They kept fighting and never gave up."

References

External links

Detroit Lions bio
Kansas City Chiefs bio
Missouri Tigers bio
Oakland Raiders bio

1985 births
Living people
Players of American football from Missouri
American football wide receivers
Canadian football wide receivers
Missouri Tigers football players
Kansas City Chiefs players
Detroit Lions players
Oakland Raiders players
Winnipeg Blue Bombers players
Las Vegas Locomotives players
Omaha Beef players
Bloomington Edge players